The Singing Bee is an Australian game show which is based on the original American version of the same name. By combining karaoke singing with a spelling bee-style competition, contestants have to sing lyrics to songs without making a mistake or risk elimination.

The show premiered on Sunday 7 October 2007 on the Nine Network, which has ordered the production of an initial eight episodes. Its recording location is in Richmond, Victoria at the Nine Network's GTV-9 studios. The Singing Bee will follow the basic rules of the American version of the show but some rule changes have been made for the Australian version.

On 22 March 2008, it was announced by the Nine Network that The Singing Bee is going back into production for a second season, with filming set to take place after the 2008 Logies. Tim Campbell took over as host from Joey Fatone. The new season premiered on the Nine Network at 8.30pm on Thursday 10 July 2008. The Nine Network has confirmed that The Singing Bee would return in 2009.

Host and singers
Former NSYNC singer and host of the original US version of the show, Joey Fatone was announced on 24 September 2007 as the host of the Australian version and was at the time in Melbourne for the show.

It was originally announced that it would be hosted by Australian musician David Campbell but due to other commitments, he was unavailable to host the show. Other media outlets have mentioned that personalities which were being considered for host included Kate Ceberano, Jon Stevens, Michael Falzon, Toby Allen and Rob Mills. The Nine Network held auditions for the series in Melbourne, Sydney and Brisbane.

Out of the four regular singers featured on the show, Rob Mills and Andrew De Silva have been announced as two of them. Lucy Holmes, former host of The Mint is also a regular on the show.

The 2008 and 2010 seasons were hosted by Tim Campbell. Singers in the house band for Season 2 include Nilusha Baeder, Lucy Holmes, Sandii Keenan, Kelly Wolfgramm, Andrew De Silva and Judd Field. The house band was headed up by Dorian West.

Format
At the start of the show, the band plays a song and the host randomly gives audience members a chance to sing part of the song. If they sing along to it enthusiastically, they become one of the six contestants on the show. This section refers to the original format of the show and not the current celebrity series.

Round 1
The host provides the year the song was released, the performer, and the name of the song. A portion of the song is performed, and then the contestant has to attempt to sing the next line of the song. If they are correct, they advance to the next round are told to walk over to the "musical chairs" and sit down. If the contestant gets the lyrics wrong however, they have to take a step back, and the next contestant in line must sing the same line of the song. This continues until someone gets it right. If no one correctly identifies the exact lyrics, the answer is given, the song is thrown out, and a new song is put into play. The first four people to correctly sing the given lyric go on to the next round, and the other two contestants are eliminated. For the celebrity edition, the contestants are given points, two for a correct lyric, and zero for a wrong answer. No one is eliminated, but the scores carryover into the next round.

Round 2
For round two, the four contestants who advanced through get paired up to play a game chosen at random in each episode from the following games:

Karaoke Challenge
The contestant sees the words to the song in karaoke fashion, similar to Don't Forget the Lyrics!. As the contestant sings the song, they will see blanks in the lyrics being displayed, each representing a word in the song. The person out of the pair who fills in the most blanks correctly (out of a possible 15) wins and goes on to the third round. If both contestants get the same number of blanks filled in each, a tie-breaker is played. For the celebrity edition, there are 13 missing words. For every word correctly sung, the player is given a point. The player who culminates the fewest points in Round 1 and 2 combined is eliminated from the game.

Lyric Scramble
While the band is performing, words from the next line of lyrics to a song are shown scrambled on the screen. The contestant is required to sing the words shown, in their correct order. When one contestant is correct and the other is wrong at any point, the one who was correct moves on to the Championship Round. If both contestants are incorrect, a tie-breaker is played, but if both contestant are correct, the round is repeated.

Round 3 (Chorus Showdown)
The two contestants who advanced through battle each other in a game called the "Chorus Showdown". This follows a similar format to the first round, but instead of singing a line, the contestant is required to sing the entire chorus without making a mistake. If both contestants sing their chorus lines correctly, the round is repeated. If both contestants sing their chorus lines incorrectly, a tie-breaker is played.

Round 4 (The Final Countdown)
The last remaining contestant who advanced through gets to play in the money round called "The Final Countdown", based on the song of the same name. Up to 7 songs are performed in a similar manner to the first round. For each song, if the lyrics are sung correctly for it, the player wins $5,000. If the player gets five songs right, they win $50,000. However, if they sing the lyrics for a song incorrectly, a strike is given. If three strikes are given (three songs are sung incorrectly) at any point during the round, the game is over but the contestant still wins whatever money was accumulated up to that point, if any. All money round contestants receive a trophy regardless of the outcome.

Technicalities

Tie-breaker
Tie-breakers apply only to rounds two and three and are used when contestants get even results while playing the games. In the tie-breaker, the two contestants are given the year and the name of the performer and the first person to answer the name of the song correctly is given the option of singing the song themselves or letting the other contestant sing it. If the singer sings the tie-breaker song without mistakes, they win and move on to the next round. If they make a mistake, the other contestant goes through.

Production
Auditions were held in Melbourne during the weekend of 18–19 August, with some 125 trying out on the Saturday and more the following day.  Auditions are done in the style of Round 1 of the show, with five contestants taking turns to complete a lyric of varying degrees of difficulty once the lead-in music stops. Channel Nine's A Current Affair taped a segment on the Saturday, which was then shown on 20 August 2007 to promote the show.  Auditions were held in the Temptation studio at GTV-9 in Richmond, Victoria.

Episodes

Episode 1 (7 October 2007)

Episode 2 (14 October 2007)

Episode 3 (21 October 2007)

Episode 4 (28 October 2007)

Episode 5 (4 November 2007)

References

External links 
 

2000s Australian game shows
2010s Australian game shows
Musical game shows
Nine Network original programming
Television shows set in Victoria (Australia)
2007 Australian television series debuts
2010 Australian television series endings
English-language television shows